The Galician Democratic Candidacy was a centre-left electoral list in Galicia contesting the 1977 Spanish Senate election in the constituencies of La Coruña, Orense and Pontevedra. It was supported by the Spanish Socialist Workers' Party (PSOE) in those districts.

References

1977 establishments in Spain
1979 disestablishments in Spain
Defunct political party alliances in Spain
Political parties established in 1977
Political parties disestablished in 1979
Political parties in Galicia (Spain)